Desmiphora fasciculata is a species of beetle in the family Cerambycidae. It was described by Guillaume-Antoine Olivier in 1792. It is known from Brazil, Bolivia, Ecuador, French Guiana, and Mexico.

References

Desmiphora
Beetles described in 1792